Toya is a genus of delphacid planthoppers in the family Delphacidae. There are at least 40 described species in Toya.

Species
These 49 species belong to the genus Toya:

 Toya actaeon (Fennah, 1958) i c g
 Toya attenuata Distant, 1906 i c g
 Toya beninu Fennah, 1975 i c g
 Toya boxi (Muir and Giffard, 1924) i c g
 Toya bridwelli (Muir, 1920) i c g
 Toya canidia Fennah, 1969 i c g
 Toya ceresensis (Muir, 1929) i c g
 Toya complexa (Muir, 1929) i c g
 Toya cularo Fennah, 1975 i c g
 Toya demophoon Fennah, 1964 i c g
 Toya dietrichi Gonzon and Bartlett, 2008 i c g
 Toya dryope (Kirkaldy, 1907) i c g
 Toya fulva (Yang, 1989) i c g
 Toya fusca Melichar, 1914 i c g
 Toya goliai Gonzon and Bartlett, 2008 i c g
 Toya hessei (Muir, 1929) i c g
 Toya hispidula (Lindberg, 1954) i c g
 Toya iaxartes (Fennah, 1959) i c g
 Toya ibiturca Asche, 1980 i c g
 Toya idonea (Beamer, 1947) i c g b
 Toya larymna Fennah, 1975 i c g
 Toya lazulis (Kirkaldy, 1907) i c g
 Toya lima (Yang, 1989) i c g
 Toya lyraeformis (Matsumura, 1900) c g
 Toya mahensis (Distant, 1917) i c g
 Toya mamurra Fennah, 1969 i c g
 Toya mandonius Fennah, 1969 i c g
 Toya mastanabal Fennah, 1969 i c g
 Toya menedema Fennah, 1969 c g
 Toya menedemus Fennah, 1969 i
 Toya minutula (Melichar, 1903) i c g
 Toya narcissus Fennah, 1969 i c g
 Toya nigeriensis (Muir, 1920) c
 Toya nigra (Crawford, 1914) i c g
 Toya obtusangula (Linnavuori, 1957) i c g
 Toya peruda Fennah, 1975 i c g
 Toya recurva Gonzon and Bartlett, 2008 i c g
 Toya salambo Fennah, 1964 i c g
 Toya siaka Fennah, 1975 i c g
 Toya simulans (Dlabola, 1958) i c g
 Toya suezensis (Matsumura, 1910) i c g
 Toya superba (Emeljanov, 1964) i c g
 Toya tateyamaella (Matsumura, 1935) c g
 Toya terryi (Muir, 1917) c
 Toya thomasseti (Muir, 1925) i c g
 Toya trophonius Fennah, 1967 c g
 Toya tuberculosa (Distant, 1916) i c g
 Toya venilia (Fennah, 1959) i c g
 Toya yanoi (Ishihara, 1952) i

Data sources: i = ITIS, c = Catalogue of Life, g = GBIF, b = Bugguide.net

References

Further reading

 
 
 

Delphacinae
Auchenorrhyncha genera
Articles created by Qbugbot